Jeanne Coyne (February 28, 1923 – May 10, 1973) was an American Broadway dancer, choreographer and actress.

Biography
With Carol Haney (1924 – 1964), Coyne assisted directors Stanley Donen and Gene Kelly, both of whom she married. She appeared as a dancer in the MGM films Words and Music, On the Town, Summer Stock, Singin' in the Rain and Kiss Me Kate.

She was married to Donen from 1948 to 1951, and to Kelly from 1960 to 1973. She and Kelly had two children, Timothy and Bridget.

She died on May 10, 1973, in Los Angeles, California, from leukemia, at the age of 50.

Filmography

References

External links

American choreographers
American stage actresses
American female dancers
Actresses from Pittsburgh
Dancers from Pennsylvania
Deaths from leukemia
1923 births
1973 deaths
Deaths from cancer in California
20th-century American actresses
20th-century American singers
20th-century American dancers